The Ialovachsk or Yalovach Formation is a geologic formation in Kyrgyzstan, Tajikistan and Uzbekistan dating to the Santonian age of the Cretaceous period.

Fossil content 
Fossil dinosaur eggs as well as pterosaur, dinosaur, turtle and crocodyliforme remains have been recovered from the formation.

The following fossils have been reported from the formation:

Amphibians
 Eopelobates sp.
 Eoscapherpeton superum

Mammals
 ?Kulbeckia kulbecke

Turtles
 Adocus foveatus
 Anatolemys maximus
 Lindholmemys gravis
 Shachemys baibolatica
 Trionyx kansaiensis
 T. riabinini

Dinosaurs
 cf. Alectrosaurus sp.
 Ankylosauridae indet.
 ?Ceratopsidae indet.
 Dromaeosauridae indet.
 Hadrosauridae indet.
 cf. Hypsilophodontidae indet.
 Kansaignathus sogdianus
 ?Neoceratopsia indet.
 Neosauropoda indet.
 Ornithomimidae indet.
 ?Oviraptoridae indet.
 Therizinosauridae indet.
 ?Theropoda indet.
 Troodontidae indet.
 Tyrannosauridae indet.

Other reptiles
 Azhdarchidae indet.
 ?Azhdarcho sp.
 Aves indet.
 Kansajsuchus extensus
 ?Pterosauria indet.
 Squamata indet.
 Tadzhikosuchus macrodentis

See also 
 List of dinosaur-bearing rock formations
 List of stratigraphic units with dinosaur trace fossils
 Dinosaur eggs

References

Bibliography

Further reading 
 I. G. Danilov, V. B. Sukhanov, and E. V. Syromyatnikova. 2011. New Asiatic materials on turtles of the family Adocidae with a review of the adocid record in Asia. Proceedings of the Zoological Institute, Russian Academy of Sciences 315(2):101-132
 N. N. Bakhurina and D. M. Unwin. 1995. a survey of pterosaurs from the Jurassic and Cretaceous of the former Soviet Union and Mongolia. Historical Biology 10:197-245
 L. A. Nessov. 1995. Dinozavri severnoi Yevrazii: Novye dannye o sostave kompleksov, ekologii i paleobiogeografii [Dinosaurs of northern Eurasia: new data about assemblages, ecology, and paleobiogeography]. Institute for Scientific Research on the Earth's Crust, St. Petersburg State University, St. Petersburg 1-156

Geologic formations of Kyrgyzstan
Geologic formations of Tajikistan
Geologic formations of Uzbekistan
Upper Cretaceous Series of Asia
Santonian Stage
Sandstone formations
Conglomerate formations
Fluvial deposits
Ooliferous formations
Paleontology in Kyrgyzstan
Paleontology in Tajikistan
Paleontology in Uzbekistan